Regla Teresa García Rodríguez (born October 13, 1937), known as Teté Caturla, is a Cuban singer who directed the vocal group Cuarteto d'Aida. She is the daughter of Alejandro García Caturla, one of the most important Cuban composers of the 1920s and 1930s.

Caturla was born on October 13, 1937, in Remedios, Villa Clara Province, Cuba. As a young woman she made her debut for Orquesta Anacaona, and in 1963 she joined Cuarteto d'Aida. Both of these were all-female groups. After Aida Diestro, the founder of the quartet, died in 1973, Teté led them, and they toured Panamá (1978), Grenada (1979), México (1983), Spain (1984), Angola (1986) and Finland (1987). More recently she toured Argentina, France, Japan, Greece and the United States.

After her retirement from the quartet, she formed the group Rumba Tere for young musicians recently graduated from their schools of music. Her work has always been in the traditional popular music of Cuba. In 2003, the CD Llegó Teté (Bis Music) was highly successful.

Teté appears briefly as a contributing singer in the 2015 video "Chan Chan - Song Around the World" by the Playing for Change movement. She can be seen performing on a balcony in Havana, Cuba.

References 

1937 births
Living people
People from Remedios, Cuba
20th-century Cuban women singers
21st-century Cuban  women singers